Oleh Kolodiy (born 16 March 1993) is a Ukrainian diver.

Career
He began diving at age 12 in Mykolayiv. His coach is Larisa Afanasyeva since then. He debuted internationally in 2012 at FINA Diving Grand Prix. He is also a multiple European championships medalist: in 2013 he won bronze in 3m synchro diving with Oleksandr Gorshkovozov and in 2015 he won bronze in 1m springboard. The 2017 European Diving Championships in home Kyiv was quite successful for Oleh where he won a silver in synchro diving with Illya Kvasha and a bronze in individual 3m springboard diving. Later that year Oleh won bronze medal in pair with Illya Kvasha at the World championships in 3m synchro. Up to date it is his best achievement in his sporting career.

He graduated from Mykolayiv National University where he studied mathematics. He received the Mykolayiv Citizen of the Year award in 2010 in the category of Sporting Hope of the Year. He holds the title of Master of Sport of International Class in Ukraine.

References

1993 births
Living people
Ukrainian male divers
Sportspeople from Mykolaiv
World Aquatics Championships medalists in diving
Divers at the 2020 Summer Olympics
Olympic divers of Ukraine